Robert Sirois (born February 6, 1954) is a Canadian retired professional ice hockey right winger who played 286 games in the National Hockey League (NHL) for the Philadelphia Flyers and Washington Capitals. Sirois is the author of a controversial book on 'racial' bias against Quebec-born hockey players.

Playing career
Born in Montreal, Quebec, Sirois was originally drafted by the Philadelphia Flyers in 1974, Sirois played in only four games with the Flyers in over two seasons before he was traded to the Washington Capitals. He spent five seasons with the Capitals before leaving the NHL to play one season in Switzerland, and then in the AHL the year after that before retiring from active play in 1982.

Career statistics

References

External links
 
Profile at hockeydraftcentral.com

1954 births
Canadian ice hockey right wingers
Hershey Bears players
Houston Aeros draft picks
Laval National players
Living people
Montreal Bleu Blanc Rouge players
Lausanne HC players
Philadelphia Flyers draft picks
Philadelphia Flyers players
Richmond Robins players
Washington Capitals players
Ice hockey people from Montreal
Canadian expatriate ice hockey players in Switzerland